Alexey Alexeyevich Gromov (born 31 May 1960) is a Russian politician. He is First Deputy Chief of Staff of the Presidential Administration of Russia.

Biography 
Gromov was born in 1960 in Zagorsk, Moscow Oblast, Soviet Union. He studied history at Moscow State University, specialising in Southern and Western Slavs and received his degree in history in 1982.  For many years after his graduation, he worked for the Soviet and then the Russian government in their respective Ministries of Foreign Affairs. He served the governments with appointments in Czechoslovakia, Russia, and Slovakia. Since 1996, he has worked directly for the president, first in the Press Office, then as Press Attache, and, since 2008, as Deputy Chief of Staff.

Sanctions 
On March 20, 2014, the Office of Foreign Assets Control (OFAC) published that Gromov and 19 other men have been added to the Specially Designated Nationals List (SDN).

On May 12, 2014, Gromov was added to the European Union sanctions list due to his role in the 2014 Crimean crisis. He is barred from entering the EU countries, and his assets in the EU have to be frozen.

Personal life 
Gromov speaks fluent Czech, Slovak and English. He is married and they have two sons, Alexey and Danila.

References

External links 
 Official biography

Licence 

1960 births
Living people
1st class Active State Councillors of the Russian Federation
People from Sergiyev Posad
Kremlin Press Secretaries
Aides to the President of Russia
Russian diplomats
Soviet politicians
Moscow State University alumni
Russian individuals subject to the U.S. Department of the Treasury sanctions
Russian individuals subject to European Union sanctions